Leonidas Sparta FC was established in 1965 in 
Sparta, the capital of Laconia.

Leonidas Sparta currently plays in the Local Championship of Laconia in the fifth tier, however once played as high as the second tier, the Football League, in 1969–70 season and 1971–72 season.

History
Leonidas Sparta FC has a long history in the field of Laconian and Greek soccer both at amateur and professional level. He was the first professional team of the prefecture of Laconia to compete in the Football League.

Players

Current squad

Honours

Domestic Titles and honours
 Local Championship of Laconia: 4
 1968, 1973, 1974, 1994

References

External links
 Leonidas Sparta FC Official website

1965 establishments in Greece
Football clubs in Greece
Association football clubs established in 1965
Leonidas I